Seyed Kazem Seyed Bagheri is an Iranian political scientist and associate professor of politics at the Research Institute for Islamic Culture and Thought. His book titled Shia's Political Fiqh won the Farabi Award and Howzeh Book of the Year Award.

Works
 Political Thought in Iran and Islam
 Mechanisms of Social Justice in Islamic Government
 Shia's Political Fiqh: Mechanisms of Contemporary Development 
 Political Power: A Koranic Viewpoint
Political Justice: A Koranic Viewpoint
 A Comparative study of Justice in Religious Democracy and Liberal Democracy

References

Farabi International Award recipients
Iranian Shia scholars of Islam
Academic staff of the Research Institute for Islamic Culture and Thought
Religion academics
Living people
Iranian political scientists
1971 births